Commodore Amadi Guy Ikwechegh (25 February 1951 – 10 November 2009) was a Nigerian naval officer who was appointed military governor of Imo State from 1986 to 1989 during the military regime of General Ibrahim Babangida.

Birth and education

Amadi Ikwechegh was born on 25 February 1951 in Amakpo, Igbere in Bende, Abia State.
He attended Township School in Aba and the Nigerian Military School, Zaria (1963 to 1966), and attended the Nigerian Defence Academy, Kaduna in 1971. He was commissioned as a sub-lieutenant in 1974. He then studied at Britannia Royal Naval College at Dartmouth, England, the Royal Hydrographic School, Australia and the Naval School of Oceanography, USA. He attended the Armed Forces Command & Staff College, Jaji, and also earned a masters in Strategic Studies from the University of Ibadan.

Naval career

As a naval officer, Ikwechegh served in various capacities including Military Port Commandant of Lagos Port, Hydrographer of the Navy, Director of Naval Intelligence and commander of the Navy's operational Bases in Okemini, Anansa and Olokun . He also commanded NNS Lana, the naval survey ship and was Commander of NNS Iriomi as Naval Task Force Commander, ECOMOG Forces, Liberia. He was a member of the Nigerian Hydrographic Society and the Nigerian Institute of Surveyors.

He served as ADC to Military Governor of Niger State, Commodore Ebitu Ukiwe.
From 1987 to 1990 he was Military Governor of Imo State and a member of the Provisional Ruling Council.

Later life

He was retired in June 1999, along with all other military officers who had held political offices. He then went into marine related business in Port Harcourt.
Amadi Ikwechegh died on 10 November 2009 after a protracted illness following a stroke he suffered in 2007.
Chief Theodore Orji, governor of Abia State from May 2007, was his senior assistant secretary when Ikwechegh was governor of old Imo State. After Ikwechegh's death, Orji described him as an intelligent and no-nonsense administrator.

References

1951 births
2009 deaths
Governors of Imo State
Graduates of Britannia Royal Naval College
Nigerian Defence Academy alumni
University of Ibadan alumni